This is a non-exhaustive list of Malta women's international footballers – association football players who have appeared at least once for the senior Malta women's national football team.

Players

See also 
 Malta women's national football team

References

 
Association football player non-biographical articles
Malta